Sharnbrook Academy, formerly Sharnbrook Upper School until 2017, is a large, rural academy school located in Sharnbrook, a village in the English county of Bedfordshire.  Built in 1975, the school now has over 1900 students and around 300 staff, and includes a large sixth form founded in 1978 of around 650 students.

The school is very popular and is currently oversubscribed, with some parents resorting to moving house into Sharnbrook's catchment area to guarantee their children a place at the school. Quite a sizeable proportion of sixth form students join the school in Year 12, having completed their compulsory education at other schools.

Age range of students
Most students join the school in Year 7 where they are aged 11. They take GCSE exams, in year 11 (ages 15–16), after which some students will leave to attend a technical college or an alternative sixth form.  Most, however, stay and join the sixth form (Years 12 and 13, ages 16–18+), where they are joined by a large number of students who have completed their GCSEs at other schools and have moved to Sharnbrook for their final two years at school.

Vertical tutoring

Beginning in  the 2003 to 2004 academic year through to the 2017 to 2018 academic year, Sharnbrook introduced vertical tutoring, a pastoral system in which each tutor group has students from each year group, from Year 9 to Year 13 (Upper Sixth). This was initially stopped for Years 12 and 13 (Sixth-Form), when Sharnbrook became a secondary school. Vertical tutoring was ended completely  when the COVID-19 pandemic started, as when the school returned for the 2020 to 2021 academic year, the tutor groups were split horizontally. In June 2022, a new house system was announced consisting of five new houses as well as the return of vertical tutoring for Years 7-10. Year 11 remained horizontal. This was introduced at the beginning of the 2022-23 academic year. The new names are Cygnus, Delphinus, Pegasus, Phoenix, and Ursa. The previous houses were Grange, Colworth, Templar, Parentines, Loring and Ouse.

To accommodate the new vertical tutor groups, a House system was devised, comprising six houses, one of which every student is a member.  Most of the staff are also assigned to a house.  Each house contains fourteen tutor groups and is led by a Head of House and an Assistant Head of House, titles which are sometimes abbreviated to HOH and AHOH, respectively.  Traditional Heads of Year still exist, although their role has greatly diminished with the arrival of Heads of House. When the school went to horizontal tutoring in 2020, the houses were retained.

The houses are named after medieval manors of Sharnbrook village.  The houses and their associated colours are displayed in the adjacent table.

Facilities
Art rooms and gallery, including a photographic darkroom and a specialist digital suite.
AstroTurf sports pitch
Climbing wall
Dance studio
Interactive whiteboards
Main Hall and Sports Hall
Music centre, incorporating two recording studios and a large music tech room 
Paula Radcliffe Community Sports Centre
Playing fields
Sixth form centre, built in 1999
Tennis courts
Television studio, edit suites
Drama Studios

The school hosted its own Farm onsite for many years (later an Animal Care Centre).

In late 2009 plans were confirmed for the construction of a new science centre, with construction due to begin early 2010. The centre was completed in November 2010. In 2011 there was a large project which included, but was not limited to, a new library (the Learning Hub), dining room (Dining 1) and another refurbished dining room (JDs).

Broadcast team
Sharnbrook Academy Media Department offers students the role of studio hands in the "Broadcast Team". The group is responsible for the running of the school broadcast system, which replaces the traditional whole school assembly. The broadcast is filmed, live, in a special television studio and gallery, situated in the heart of the academy.

Specialisms and academy status
Sharnbrook is a Training School, a Partnership Promotion School, a Beacon School and has received the Artsmark Gold and Sportsmark awards from the Arts Council England and Sport England, respectively. Previously Sharnbrook was granted specialist school status as a media Arts College.

On 1 February 2011, Sharnbrook Upper School formally gained academy status.

School day
As of September 2020, the school day begins at 8.30 am and ends at 3.00 pm. Prior to this date, the school day finished at 3.15 pm.
The 2015/16 academic year saw the introduction of a reduced Tuesday (starting 8.30 am and finishing 2.45 pm) to allow teachers to cope with changing specifications. But that early finish stopped in the 17/18 academic year.
In September 2020, a new reduced school day was introduced due to the COVID-19 pandemic, with it starting at 8.30 am as normal but finishing at 3pm, it was retained for the 2021/2022 and 2022/2023 academic years.
Also in the 2022/23 academic year, "Movement Time" was introduced, a 5 minute gap between the ends of Periods 1 and 2 and Periods 3 and 4 for movement across the school, it was introduced due to students frequently being late to lessons.

Catchment area
The catchment area for Sharnbrook Academy includes the parishes of Bletsoe, Bolnhurst and Keysoe, Carlton and Chellington, Clapham, Dean and Shelton, Felmersham and Radwell, Harrold, Knotting and Souldrop, Little Staughton, Melchbourne and Yielden, Sharnbrook, Stevington, Milton Ernest, Oakley, Odell, Pavenham, Pertenhall, Podington, Hinwick and Farndish, Thurleigh, Turvey, Riseley, Swineshead and Wymington.

Trust
Sharnbrook Academy, along with 24 other schools, form part of the Meridian Trust (formerly Cambridge Meridian Academies Trust (CMAT)). The school formerly formed part of the Sharnbrook Academy Federation (SAF) until 2021.

Notable former pupils

 Jack Collison, professional footballer
 Shaunagh Craig, Northern Ireland netball international
 Jane Elliott, sociologist and academic
 Oliver Gavin, Corvette Racing Driver
 Cal Henderson, software architect and web developer (Yahoo, Flickr, Slack Co-founder and CTO)
 Matt Jackson, professional footballer 
 Sean Longden, historian and author of To The Victor The Spoils, Hitler's British Slaves and Dunkirk, The Men They Left Behind
 Paula Radcliffe, marathon runner and world record holder
 Nick Tandy, Porsche Factory Racing Driver & outright winner of the 2015 24 Hour of Le Mans
 Giles Scott, Sailor. Rio 2016 Olympic Gold Medalist in the Finn Class and 4 time World Champion.
 Alfie Templeman, singer songwriter & multi-instrumentalist.
 Matt Berry, actor, voice actor, comedian, writer, musician. Famously played Douglas Renholm in Graham Linehan's IT Crowd.

References

External links
 Official website
 Ofsted Report June 2006
 Ofsted Report March 2009
 Ofsted Report 2013
 VerticalTutoring.org, a website created by Sharnbrook's former Principal, Peter Barnard

Training schools in England
Secondary schools in the Borough of Bedford
Academies in the Borough of Bedford
Educational institutions established in 1975
1975 establishments in England
Academy